Eupithecia barteli is a moth in the family Geometridae. It is found in Afghanistan, the southeastern part of European Russia, north-western Kazakhstan, Tajikistan, Nepal, India (Himachal Pradesh) and China (Shaanxi, Yunnan).

The wingspan is about 17 mm.

References

Moths described in 1908
barteli
Moths of Europe
Moths of Asia